The F.C. Copenhagen Player of the Year award is voted for annually by the members of the official fan club for F.C. Copenhagen, FCKFC, in recognition of the best overall performance by an individual player throughout the football season. Towards the end of each season, members are invited to cast their votes for this award. The winner is the player who polls the most votes. The recipient is awarded a diploma, presented on the pitch before one of the last home games of the season.

The inaugural award has existed as long as the club, and was given to Palle Petersen at the end of the club's first season.

Winners
Player name in bold text represents players still on the playing staff of the club.

Wins by playing position

Wins by nationality

Notes

References

External links
FCKFC

Player of the Year
F.C. Cope
Association football player non-biographical articles